The 2018 Vancouver municipal election was held on October 20, 2018, the same day as other municipalities and regional districts in British Columbia selected their new municipal governments. Voters elected a mayor, 10 city councillors, 7 park board commissioners, and 9 school board trustees through plurality-at-large voting. Official registration for all candidates opened on September 4, 2018, and closed on September 14, 2018.

For the first time, candidates were listed in random order instead of alphabetical order. This was done in an effort to create a more even playing field for candidates, as research has shown many voters are more likely to vote for those listed first on a ballot, giving those candidates a perceived advantage over those lower down on the list.

Candidates and results

Mayor
Incumbent Gregor Robertson, who had been mayor of Vancouver since being elected in 2008, announced on January 10, 2018, that he would not be running for reelection in the 2018 election.

At the close of nominations, 21 candidates had formally registered to run for mayor in the election.

Formerly declared mayoral candidates 
 Patrick Condon (Coalition of Progressive Electors) withdrew from the race on July 13, 2018.
 Ian Campbell (Vision Vancouver) withdrew from the race on September 10, 2018.

City councillors

176,450 ballots were cast. Voters were able to cast votes for up to 10 candidates. The top 10 candidates were elected.

Party standings in City Council

Park Board commissioners
Top 7 candidates elected

Party standings in Park Board

School Board trustees
Top 9 candidates elected

Party standings in School Board

Opinion polls

References

External links
 City of Vancouver election website
 Elections BC 2018 municipal elections webpage

2018 elections in Canada
Municipal elections in Vancouver
2018 in British Columbia
2010s in Vancouver